Wings is a studio album by Peter Kater, released in 2019.

The album received a Grammy Award for Best New Age Album.

References

2019 albums
Grammy Award for Best New Age Album